The Arkun Dam an embankment dam on the Çoruh River near İspir in Erzurum Province, Turkey. Construction began in 2011 and the primary purpose of the dam is hydroelectric power generation. It is part of the Çoruh Development Plan and its construction is being supervised by Turkey's State Hydraulic Works. The dam and power plant were completed early, in June 2014. Water from the dam's reservoir supplies two power stations; one at the dam's toe (base) (11.92 MW) and the other downstream (225 MW) in Artvin Province.

See also

Yusufeli Dam – under construction downstream

References

Dams in Erzurum Province
Earth-filled dams
Hydroelectric power stations in Turkey
Dams on the Çoruh River
Dams completed in 2014
2014 establishments in Turkey
Energy infrastructure completed in 2014
21st-century architecture in Turkey